= Agnar Bachen =

Norwegian-British ship captain

Agnar Bachen (1922–1996) was a Norwegian, later naturalized British ship captain. He is mainly notable for having taken the first major shipment of grain from the City of Duluth, Minnesota to Europe establishing Duluth as port city on America’s fourth seacoast one year before the opening of the St Lawrence Seaway in 1959.

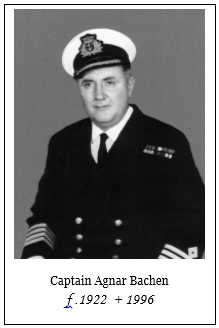
Captain Agnar Bachen

== Life ==
Born in Hoybakken near Trondheim, Norway 1922, Bachen was the third son and youngest child of Captain Hans Petter Bachen. Following in his father’s footsteps Bachen started his maritime career at the age of 14 when he stowed away aboard his uncle’s windjammer cargo ship. He rapidly worked his way up through the ranks to become bosun. Thereafter Bachen attended maritime college and became one of the youngest officers to gain a Master’s ticket. Later during routine trips to the port of Liverpool Bachen met and married Englishwoman Edna Price. The couple settled in Wallasey, Merseyside, England where they had four children. Bachen finally ended his career working out of the port of Hong Kong as senior Master Mariner responsible for officer training.

== Establishing Duluth as an international sea port ==
The movement of grain from Duluth to Liverpool via the proposed St. Lawrence Ship Channel had been discussed in the Iowa Senate as early as 1911. On 29 August 1958 Bachen took his vessel the Norwegian freighter SS Fossum up the St Lawrence Seaway and across the Great Lakes all the way up to the City of Duluth Minnesota, USA. This was an historic event for the city of Duluth thereby gaining status as a port city on America’s forth seacoast. The Fossum became the first ship to move grain from Duluth to Europe with Captain Bachen and local river pilots successfully navigating the Fossum through channels as shallow as 14 feet. In recognition of his achievement Captain Bachen was awarded a Ducal Decree and made Ambassador Extraordinary by dignitaries from the city of Duluth who also held a public holiday in celebration of the historic event. The St Lawrence Deep Waterway opened one year later in 1959.
